Planet X Television is a TV show, with a focus on action and extreme sports; launched in early 1995 on Prime Sports (now known as FSN / Fox Sports Net); the same summer as ESPN's X Games (then known as the Extreme Games).

Planet X covers international action, alternative, adventure and extreme sports events, such as: surf, skate, snowboarding, BMX, wakeboarding, off-road, jetski, rock climbing, snowmobiling, skydiving, base jumping, etc.

Planet X is syndicated in the United States and abroad through broadcast, cable, and satellite outlets and through its own broadband unit - XIMA TV (XIMA is an acronym for the Extreme Independent Media Alliance).

Its parent company, Planet One Ventures maintains various other reality TV properties in the health and fitness categories.

In Summer, 2008 Planet X launched a cable TV channel that features youth action sports and music topics as well as its new national TV series - "Planet X @ WaveHouse" (from the WaveHouse facility in San Diego's Belmont Park).

Founded by D.P. Durban and M.D. Winter

References

External links
 Planet X website

Fox Sports Networks original programming